Sola is a Cuban town and consejo popular ("people's council", i.e. hamlet) of the municipality of Sierra de Cubitas, in Camagüey Province.With a population (2011) of about 10,000, it is the largest settlement of its municipality, including the seat town of Cubitas.

History
Founded on September 28, 1920, it was originally part of Camagüey municipality until the 1977 administrative reform, when it became part of the new municipality of Sierra de Cubitas, whose seat, Cubitas, was founded in the end of 1976.

Geography
Located on a wide rural plain, few km south of the Atlantic Coast and the island of Cayo Guajaba, Sola is divided into a pair of circumscriptions named "Sola 1" and "Sola 2". It is 8 km from La Gloria, 10 from Cubitas, 18 from Senado, 25 from Minas, 30 from Lugareño, 37 from Brasil, 50 from Nuevitas, 51 from Esmeralda and 60 from Camagüey city centre.

Transport
Sola is crossed to the south by the state highway "Circuito Norte" (CN), and in the middle by the provincial road 5-521. It counts a railway station on the Santa Clara-Camajuaní-Morón-Nuevitas line, with local and long-distance trains, connecting the town with Havana too.

Health 
The village has a general hospital named "Policlínico 13 de Marzo", located between the centre and the Circuito Norte.

See also
Sierra de Cubitas Municipal Museum
Municipalities of Cuba
List of cities in Cuba

References

External links

 House of Culture of Sola
Sola Weather on accuweather.com

Populated places in Camagüey Province
Populated places established in 1920